The Kunkels Pass (German: Kunkelspass) (el. 1,357 m) is a mountain pass in Eastern Switzerland across the Glarus Alps. It connects Vättis in the canton of St. Gallen to Tamins in the canton of Graubünden. The pass itself is located south of the hamlet of Kunkels within Graubünden. The Kunkels Pass is traversed by a small road.

The pass is overlooked by the Ringelspitz and by the Calanda.

References
Swisstopo maps

External links 

Mountain passes of Graubünden
Mountain passes of the Alps
Tamins